Events in the year 2020 in Togo.

Incumbents 

 President: Faure Gnassingbé
 Prime Minister: Komi Sélom Klassou

Events 
7 January – Emeritus Archbishop of Lomé, Philippe Fanoko Kossi Kpodzro, calls for the suspension the February 22 presidential election to pave the way for electoral reforms.
14 January – Authorities in Ivory Coast say they rescued 137 children from Benin, Ghana, Niger, Nigeria, and Togo, aged 6 to 17, who were the victims of traffickers and groomed to work on cocoa plantations or in prostitution.
22 January – Globeleq and the government of Togo sign an agreement to develop between 24MW and 30MW of reliable, low cost, 100% renewable energy to support Togo's industrial development.
22 February – 2020 Togolese presidential election: President Faure Gnassingbé of the Union for the Republic (UPR) is re-elected for his fourth term with 71% of the vote in the first round.
 6 March – Togolese authorities announce the first COVID-19 case in the country, a 42-year-old Togolese woman who travelled between Germany, France, Turkey, and Benin before returning to Togo.
15 March – In a historic first, all Peace Corps volunteers worldwide are withdrawn from their host countries.
 27 March – The first COVID-19 death occurs in the country.
27 April – Independence Day (from France, 1960)
25 May – Africa Day
14 September – COVID-19 pandemic in Togo: Togo receives 12 health workers sent by the government of Cuba.

Deaths
11 April – Edem Kodjo, 81, politician, Prime Minister (1994–1996, 2005–2006) and Chairperson of the African Union Commission (1978–1983)
30 May – Yawovi Agboyibo, 76, politician, Prime Minister (2006–2007)
15 October – Fambaré Ouattara Natchaba, 75, politician, President of the National Assembly (2000–2005), Minister of Foreign Affairs (1992–1994) and MP (1994–2005).

See also

2020 in West Africa
2020 in politics and government
2020s in political history
Economic Community of West African States
Community of Sahel–Saharan States
COVID-19 pandemic in Togo
COVID-19 pandemic in Africa

References 

 
2020s in Togo
Years of the 21st century in Togo
Togo
Togo